The Selected Letters of Philip Larkin, 1940–1985 is a volume of Philip Larkin's personal correspondence, compiled by Anthony Thwaite, one of Larkin's literary executors, and published in 1992 by Faber and Faber, seven years after Larkin's death. It was followed a year later by Philip Larkin: A Writer's Life, Larkin's official biography, written by Andrew Motion, Larkin's other literary executor.

A further volume, of Larkin's correspondence with Monica Jones, was published in 2010.

List of recipients included in the selection
Kingsley Amis
John Betjeman
Robert Conquest
Colin Gunner
Monica Jones
Eva Larkin
Charles Monteith
Bruce Montgomery
Barbara Pym

See also
The Letters of Kingsley Amis

References

Philip Larkin
1992 non-fiction books
Correspondences
Faber and Faber books
Collections of letters